The employment rate of the Russian population has been quite low since the Soviet era when the birth rate fell, and the number of women involved in the economy rose sharply. After the labor market crisis during the shock therapy of the 1990s, renewed economic growth and a decline in the economically active population of Russia in the 1990s reduced the unemployment rate and increased employment.

The number of unemployed in Russia is assessed by Federal State Statistics Service through surveys of the population using a special method.

The official statistical level of unemployment in Russia, as of September 2016, according to Rosstat, amounted to 5.2% of the economically active population (labor force) or 4.0 million people, unchanged in relation to September 2015 year — the same 5.2% (4.0 million people)..

The number of unemployed registered in the Employment Centers is 917 thousand people, as of 18.10.2015, 991 thousand as of 22.06.2016. Such a low level of registered unemployment is explained by the fact that employment centers automatically remove from the register all unemployed people who have refused the job offered to them 2 times in a row. And in the employment center, as a rule, vacancies with a minimum wage are offered. The maximum period for payment of unemployment benefits is one year from the date of dismissal from the last job.

Despite the fact that women in Russia are actively employed in the economy, in Russia, some employers still practice gender and age discrimination. In recent years, the situation with discrimination against women has improved, for example, by 2014, the number of women among company leaders, according to Grant Thornton International, in Russia is 43%, which is the highest rate in the world. The most widely practiced discrimination by employers is age discrimination, the decline in wages for men is noted after 38 years, for women, the decline in wages begins after 44 years. In addition to discrimination, another problem of employment in Russia, despite the officially low unemployment rate, is the widespread shadow employment (more than 20% of the economically active population since 2014), which for many is an alternative to unemployment.

See also
Parasitism (social offense)

References

Economy of Russia
 
Employment in Russia
Russia